The 1951–52 AHL season was the 16th season of the American Hockey League. Nine teams played 68 games each in the schedule. The Pittsburgh Hornets won their first F. G. "Teddy" Oke Trophy as West Division champions, and their first Calder Cup as league champions.

Team changes
 The Springfield Indians move to Syracuse, New York, becoming the Syracuse Warriors.

Final standings
Note: GP = Games played; W = Wins; L = Losses; T = Ties; GF = Goals for; GA = Goals against; Pts = Points;

Scoring leaders

Note: GP = Games played; G = Goals; A = Assists; Pts = Points; PIM = Penalty minutes

 complete list

Calder Cup playoffs

Round 1
Pittsburgh Hornets 4, Hershey Bears 1

Providence Reds 3, Cleveland Barons 2

Cincinnati Mohawks 3, Buffalo Bisons 0

Round 2
Providence Reds 3, Cincinnati Mohawks 1

Calder Cup Finals
Pittsburgh Hornets 4, Providence Reds 2

Trophy and Award winners
Team Awards

Individual Awards

See also
List of AHL seasons

References
AHL official site
AHL Hall of Fame
HockeyDB

Newspapers

Attendance Figures - Cincinnati Enquirer 03-19-1952, 03-21-1952, 04-04-1952, and 04-06-1952

American Hockey League seasons
AHL